Daniel Kutev (born 6 March 1991 in Zlatograd) is a Bulgarian footballer who plays as a winger for Levski Lom.

Career
Born in Zlatograd, Kutev began his career playing for Rodopa Smolyan. During 2010–11 season, he scored 17 goals in the South-East V AFG, the third division of Bulgarian football.

On 2 June 2012, following a short trial period Kutev signed for Skoda Xanthi on a five-year deal. He made his Superleague Greece debut on 10 November in a 1–0 away loss against PAS Giannina, coming on as a substitute for Benjamin Onwuachi.

On 12 January 2013, Kutev was loaned out to Football League side Kavala for the rest of the season. On the following day, he played his first game, coming on as a substitute in the 64th minute in a 1–0 win over Fokikos at home.

On 15 June 2016 Kutev joined Botev Plovdiv on a trial. Following his good performance in friendly games he signed a full-time contract.  He was released in January 2017.

On 9 July 2017, Kutev signed with newly promoted Vitosha Bistritsa.

Career statistics
(Correct )

References

External links

1991 births
Living people
People from Zlatograd
Bulgarian footballers
Bulgarian expatriate footballers
Association football midfielders
PFC Rodopa Smolyan players
Xanthi F.C. players
Kavala F.C. players
Botev Plovdiv players
FC Vitosha Bistritsa players
Super League Greece players
First Professional Football League (Bulgaria) players
Expatriate footballers in Greece